Quinton Township is a township in Salem County, in the U.S. state of New Jersey. At the 2010 United States Census, the township's population was 2,666, reflecting a decline of 120 (−4.3%) from the 2,786 counted in the 2000 Census, which had in turn increased by 275 (+11.0%) from the 2,511 counted in the 1990 Census.

Quinton was formally incorporated as a township by an act of the New Jersey Legislature on February 18, 1873, from portions of Upper Alloways Creek Township (now Alloway Township). The township's name is said to derive from the name of an early settler, with both Tobias Quinton and Edward Quinton mentioned as possible namesakes.  In March 1778, during the American Revolutionary War, a minor battle was fought between British forces and local militia at Quinton's Bridge.

It is a dry township, where alcohol cannot legally be sold.

Geography

According to the United States Census Bureau, the township had a total area of 24.27 square miles (62.87 km2), including 23.79 square miles (61.62 km2) of land and 0.48 square miles (1.25 km2) of water (1.98%).

Quinton CDP (with a 2010 Census population of 588) is an unincorporated community and census-designated place (CDP) located within Quinton Township.

Unincorporated communities located partially or completely within the township Berrys Chapel, Harmony, Mickles Mill, Pecks Corner, Woodmere and Woods Upper Mill.

The township borders the  municipalities of Alloway Township, Lower Alloways Creek Township, Mannington Township and Salem in Salem County; and Stow Creek Township in Cumberland County.

Demographics

Census 2010

The Census Bureau's 2006–2010 American Community Survey showed that (in 2010 inflation-adjusted dollars) median household income was $65,061 (with a margin of error of +/− $4,282) and the median family income was $75,833 (+/− $6,396). Males had a median income of $58,542 (+/− $8,331) versus $34,615 (+/− $9,700) for females. The per capita income for the borough was $29,805 (+/− $2,517). About 4.2% of families and 6.0% of the population were below the poverty line, including 10.6% of those under age 18 and 1.7% of those age 65 or over.

Census 2000
As of the 2000 United States Census there were 2,786 people, 1,074 households, and 778 families residing in the township. The racial makeup of the township was 82.05% White, 14.47% African American, 1.08% Native American, 0.32% Asian, 0.72% from other races, and 1.36% from two or more races. Hispanic or Latino of any race were 1.51% of the population.

There were 1,074 households, out of which 29.3% had children under the age of 18 living with them, 57.9% were married couples living together, 10.1% had a female householder with no husband present, and 27.5% were non-families. 22.7% of all households were made up of individuals, and 10.4% had someone living alone who was 65 years of age or older. The average household size was 2.56 and the average family size was 3.02.

In the township the population was spread out, with 23.6% under the age of 18, 6.8% from 18 to 24, 29.9% from 25 to 44, 23.9% from 45 to 64, and 15.8% who were 65 years of age or older. The median age was 39 years. For every 100 females, there were 99.7 males. For every 100 females age 18 and over, there were 99.3 males.

The median income for a household in the township was $41,193, and the median income for a family was $48,272. Males had a median income of $32,394 versus $22,198 for females. The per capita income for the township was $18,921. About 7.8% of families and 9.3% of the population were below the poverty line, including 10.5% of those under age 18 and 4.4% of those age 65 or over.

Government

Local government
Quinton Township is governed under the Township form of New Jersey municipal government, one of 141 municipalities (of the 564) statewide that use this form, the second-most commonly used form of government in the state. The governing body is comprised of a three-member Township Committee, whose members are elected directly by the voters at-large in partisan elections to serve three-year terms of office on a staggered basis, with one seat coming up for election each year in a three-year cycle as part of the November general election. At an annual reorganization meeting, the Township Committee selects one of its members to serve as Mayor.

, members of the Quinton Township Committee are Mayor Marjorie L. Sperry (R, term on committee ends December 31, 2023; term as mayor ends 2022), Deputy Mayor Joseph J. Hannagan Jr. (R, term on committee ends 2024; term as deputy mayor ends 2022) and Raymond C. Owens (R, 2022).

Joseph Donelson, a former councilmember and mayor, was selected in October 2013 by the Township Council from among three candidates recommended by the municipal Democratic committee to fill the vacant seat expiring in December 2015 of Carl E. Schrier, who had resigned earlier that month. In November 2014, Joseph J. Hannagan Jr., was elected to serve the balance of the term.

Federal, state and county representation 
Quinton Township is located in the 2nd Congressional District and is part of New Jersey's 3rd state legislative district.

 

Salem County is governed by a five-member Board of County Commissioners who are elected at-large to serve three-year terms of office on a staggered basis, with either one or two seats coming up for election each year. At an annual reorganization meeting held in the beginning of January, the board selects a Director and a Deputy Director from among its members. , Salem County's Commissioners (with party, residence and term-end year listed in parentheses) are 
Director Benjamin H. Laury (R, Elmer, term as commissioner ends December 31, 2024; term as director ends 2022), 
Deputy Director Gordon J. "Mickey" Ostrum, Jr. (R, Pilesgrove Township, term as commissioner ends 2024; term as deputy director ends 2022),  
R. Scott Griscom (R, Mannington Township, 2022), 
Edward A. Ramsay (R, Pittsgrove Township, 2023) and
Lee R. Ware (D, Elsinboro Township, 2022). Constitutional officers elected on a countywide basis are 
County Clerk Dale A. Cross (R, 2024),
Sheriff Charles M. Miller (R, 2024) and 
Surrogate Nicki A. Burke (D, 2023).

Politics
As of March 23, 2011, there were a total of 1,701 registered voters in Quinton Township, of which 533 (31.3% vs. 30.6% countywide) were registered as Democrats, 388 (22.8% vs. 21.0%) were registered as Republicans and 778 (45.7% vs. 48.4%) were registered as Unaffiliated. There were two voters registered as either Libertarians or Greens. Among the township's 2010 Census population, 63.8% (vs. 64.6% in Salem County) were registered to vote, including 83.5% of those ages 18 and over (vs. 84.4% countywide).

In the 2012 presidential election, Republican Mitt Romney received 55.6% of the vote (673 cast), ahead of Democrat Barack Obama with 43.1% (522 votes), and other candidates with 1.2% (15 votes), among the 1,215 ballots cast by the township's 1,763 registered voters (5 ballots were spoiled), for a turnout of 68.9%. In the 2008 presidential election, Republican John McCain received 679 votes (52.6% vs. 46.6% countywide), ahead of Democrat Barack Obama with 587 votes (45.5% vs. 50.4%) and other candidates with 11 votes (0.9% vs. 1.6%), among the 1,291 ballots cast by the township's 1,710 registered voters, for a turnout of 75.5% (vs. 71.8% in Salem County). In the 2004 presidential election, Republican George W. Bush received 694 votes (57.3% vs. 52.5% countywide), ahead of Democrat John Kerry with 495 votes (40.8% vs. 45.9%) and other candidates with 16 votes (1.3% vs. 1.0%), among the 1,212 ballots cast by the township's 1,662 registered voters, for a turnout of 72.9% (vs. 71.0% in the whole county).

In the 2013 gubernatorial election, Republican Chris Christie received 71.4% of the vote (546 cast), ahead of Democrat Barbara Buono with 25.9% (198 votes), and other candidates with 2.7% (21 votes), among the 774 ballots cast by the township's 1,733 registered voters (9 ballots were spoiled), for a turnout of 44.7%. In the 2009 gubernatorial election, Republican Chris Christie received 438 votes (47.9% vs. 46.1% countywide), ahead of Democrat Jon Corzine with 338 votes (37.0% vs. 39.9%), Independent Chris Daggett with 94 votes (10.3% vs. 9.7%) and other candidates with 33 votes (3.6% vs. 2.0%), among the 914 ballots cast by the township's 1,738 registered voters, yielding a 52.6% turnout (vs. 47.3% in the county).

Education
The Quinton Township School District serves public school students in pre-kindergarten through eighth grade at Quinton Township Elementary School. As of the 2018–19 school year, the district, comprised of one school, had an enrollment of 311 students and 28.5 classroom teachers (on an FTE basis), for a student–teacher ratio of 10.9:1.

Public school students in ninth through twelfth grades attend Salem High School in Salem City, together with students from Elsinboro Township, Lower Alloways Creek Township and Mannington Township, as part of a sending/receiving relationship with the Salem City School District. As of the 2018–19 school year, the high school had an enrollment of 374 students and 44.0 classroom teachers (on an FTE basis), for a student–teacher ratio of 8.5:1.

Transportation

Roads that pass through the township include Route 49 (Quinton-Marlboro Road, which traverses the township northwest to southeast), County Route 540 and County Route 581 (including its southern terminus at Route 49).

Notable people

People who were born in, residents of, or otherwise closely associated with Quinton Township include:
 Shameka Marshall (born 1983), long jumper who won the gold medal at the 2007 NACAC Championships in Athletics

References

External links

Historic Quinton Township Home page
Quinton Township page on Salem County website
Quinton Township Elementary School

School Data for the Quinton Township School District, National Center for Education Statistics

 
1873 establishments in New Jersey
Populated places established in 1873
Township form of New Jersey government
Townships in Salem County, New Jersey